Magnus I, Duke of Mecklenburg (1345 – 1 September 1384) was Duke of Mecklenburg from 1383 until his death.  Magnus was the third son of Duke Albert II of Mecklenburg and his wife Euphemia of Sweden, the sister of the King Magnus IV of Sweden.  Sometime after 1362, he married Elizabeth of Pomerania-Wolgast, daughter of Barnim IV, Duke of Pomerania.

Magnus had two children:
 John IV, Regent of Mecklenburg from 1384 to 1395 and co-regent from 1395 to 1422
 Euphemia (d. 16 October 1417);
 married on 18 October 1397 with Lord Balthasar of Werle

After the death of his brother Henry III in 1383, he ruled Mecklenburg jointly with Henry's son Albert IV until his own death in 1384.

External links 
 Genealogical table of the House of Mecklenburg

House of Mecklenburg
Dukes of Mecklenburg-Schwerin
1345 births
1384 deaths